Bastián Esteban Labbé Salazar (born 6 May 1990) is a Chilean teacher who was elected as a member of the Chilean Constitutional Convention.

References

External links
 BCN Profile

1991 births
Living people
21st-century Chilean politicians
Members of the Chilean Constitutional Convention
University of Concepción alumni